The Dunellen Public Schools are a comprehensive community public school district that serves students in pre-kindergarten through twelfth grade from Dunellen, in Middlesex County, New Jersey, United States.

As of the 2020–21 school year, the district, comprised of three schools, had an enrollment of 1,238 students and 112.0 classroom teachers (on an FTE basis), for a student–teacher ratio of 11.1:1.

The district is classified by the New Jersey Department of Education as being in District Factor Group "FG", the fourth-highest of eight groupings. District Factor Groups organize districts statewide to allow comparison by common socioeconomic characteristics of the local districts. From lowest socioeconomic status to highest, the categories are A, B, CD, DE, FG, GH, I and J.

Awards and recognition
Lincoln Middle School was recognized by Governor Jim McGreevey in 2003 as one of 25 schools selected statewide for the First Annual Governor's School of Excellence award.

Schools
Schools in the district (with 2020–21 enrollment data from the National Center for Education Statistics) are:
Elementary school
John P. Faber School with 591 students in grades PreK-5
Brendan Tennant, Principal
Middle school
Lincoln Middle School with 246 students in grades 6-8
Robert Altmire, Principal
High school
Dunellen High School with 372 students in grades 9-12
Paul Lynch, Principal

Administration
Core members of the district's administration are:
Daniel J. Ross, Superintendent
Johnny Rosa, Business Administrator / Board Secretary

Board of education
The district's board of education, comprised of nine members, sets policy and oversees the fiscal and educational operation of the district through its administration. As a Type II school district, the board's trustees are elected directly by voters to serve three-year terms of office on a staggered basis, with three seats up for election each year held (since 2012) as part of the November general election. The board appoints a superintendent to oversee the district's day-to-day operations and a business administrator to supervise the business functions of the district.

References

External links
Dunellen Public Schools
 
School Data for the Dunellen Public Schools, National Center for Education Statistics

Dunellen, New Jersey
New Jersey District Factor Group FG
School districts in Middlesex County, New Jersey